Medini may refer to:

 Medini (Bugojno), an abandoned village in the municipality of Bugojno, Bosnia and Herzegovina
 Medini Iskandar Malaysia, a suburb in Iskandar Puteri, Johor Bahru District, Johor, Malaysia
 Gaetano Medini, an Italian-born German chef
 P. K. Medini, a revolutionary singer, musician, stage artist
 Chaim Hezekiah Medini, a rabbinical scholar during the nineteenth century